The men's road race at the 1985 UCI Road World Championships was the 52nd edition of the event. The race took place on Sunday 1 September 1985 in Italy. Bernard Hinault had won the Giro and the Tour and was attempting to become only the second rider to win the Triple Crown, but he abandoned the race long before the winning group formed. The race was won by Joop Zoetemelk of the Netherlands.

Final classification

References

Men's Road Race
UCI Road World Championships – Men's road race
1985 Super Prestige Pernod International